Polverigi is a comune (municipality) in the Province of Ancona in the Italian region Marche, located about  southwest of Ancona.

Polverigi borders the following municipalities: Agugliano, Ancona, Jesi, Offagna, Osimo, Santa Maria Nuova.

Culture
Inteatro Festival is an international festival dedicated to the contemporary scene.

It produces and promotes theatre and dance, with a special attention to interdisciplinary experiences and international cooperation dynamics.

References

External links
 Official website

Cities and towns in the Marche